A Jarabacoa is a cocktail made with spiced rum, honey, lime juice, vanilla, cinnamon, and cola. Jarabacoas are usually served in a cocktail glass or lowball.

Recipe
Mix 6 parts rum, 1 part honey, and 1 part lime juice; heat until honey dissolves.
Allow mix to cool. 
Pour 1 part mix and 1 part cola and a few drops of vanilla extract over ice into martini shaker, shake very gently.
Pour into cocktail glass and garnish with a bit of cinnamon.

History
The history of the Jarabacoa cocktail is unknown, it is named after a municipality in the Dominican Republic. It is speculated that the term was coined by a traveller upon returning from a stay in Jarabacoa.

Cocktails with rum
Cocktails with lime juice
Tiki drinks